The Sennar Dam is an irrigation dam on the Blue Nile near the town of Sennar in the Al Jazirah region of Sudan. It was designed by the Scottish engineer Sir Murdoch MacDonald, begun in 1914 and completed in 1925 by the British contractor S Pearson & Sons.

Construction
Work on the dam started in 1914, but was almost immediately interrupted by the outbreak of World War I. Work recommenced in 1919, the contractors being the Sudan Construction Company, who carried on the work until 1921 when work was stopped for a second time as it became clear that the estimated cost of the scheme would be considerably exceeded.

In 1922, with further funds obtained, six British firms were invited to tender to complete the dam and build the connecting canal system. S Pearson and Sons was successful, and contracted to complete the dam by July 1925. Oswald Longstaff Prowde was a resident engineer and John Watson Gibson was site agent. Work began in December 1922 and the dam was finished in May 1925.

The Sennar dam is one of the highlights of the state of Sennar as the first dam built in the country with a lake capacity of about 390 million cubic meters of water used in irrigating agricultural projects such as Blue Nile Agricultural Foundation, Al Sookie agriculture project, Al Managel agriculture project, Aljazeera agriculture project, west of Sennar  sugar project,  and the Al-Rahad agriculture project, in addition to the use of storage in hydraulic power generation, which is estimated to have a production of about 14 MW covering more than 80% of sennar state's consumption and covers the slight deficit of the national grid.

References

External links

Al Jazirah (state)
Blue Nile
Dams completed in 1925
Dams in Sudan
Dams in the Nile basin
Sennar (state)